Peschany Borok is a rural locality (a settlement) in Lebyazhinsky Selsoviet, Yegoryevsky District, Altai Krai, Russia. The population was 117 as of 2013. There is 1 street.

Geography 
Peschany Borok is located 18 km southeast of Novoyegoryevskoye (the district's administrative centre) by road. Sibir is the nearest rural locality.

References 

Rural localities in Yegoryevsky District, Altai Krai